MintJam is a Japanese hard rock band formed in Tokyo in 2003. They began to create instrumental music for video game covers, and went on to creating their own original instrumental and vocal music. As of 2018 they are more heavily focused as a vocal group with a modern rock sound. They have released several full length albums, as well as many Maxi Singles. Their most recent full length album, Eclipse, was released in June 2018. They also occasionally play live. Current members include vocalist TERRA and guitarist a2c.

History

MintJam was formed in 2003 by setzer (guitars), and a2c (guitars) as an amateur band in the Japanese indie music community MUZIE. Keyboardist Kya (キャ) joined later that year when MintJam began to achieve wider recognition. In 2006, Kya officially left MintJam after the release of their fifth album Energy Drive. Vocalist TERRA joined MintJam in 2005. Besides vocal works composed by TERRA, MintJam is known for instrumental compositions as both a2c and setzer are both composers and arrangers. In 2012, setzer left MintJam and officially became a supporting member, choosing to focus on his work with his circle Polo Rockers.

MintJam has been an active participant in Japanese coterie performances. They have composed soundtracks and musical scores/background music for Japanese anime and games. They also mixed and published albums on the internet which a select are available on Itunes globally.

MintJam began their performance career with the release of their single album Judgment Day in September 2009. In August 2010, MintJam collaborated with Japanese female singer RITA. The nominal title “MintJam with RITA” allowed MintJam to take part in the Japanese show “ちょっかな”.

During 2013 to present day they often release Maxi Singles. Their most recent full length album is Eclipse, released on June 30 2018. It's their first full length album since 2010's Identity.
A new take of "Ride the Wind" from their 2007 album Reincarnation was released as a digital download single in August 2018.

Band members

 a2c – guitar
 TERRA – vocal
setzer – keyboard
A.koga（エーコガ）– former member: December, 2004-July, 2005
Kya（キャ）– former member: June, 2003-August, 2006

Albums

References

Japanese hard rock musical groups
Musical groups established in 2003